The Sabar or Răstoaca is a left tributary of the river Argeș in Romania. It discharges into the Argeș in Valea Dragului. Its source is near the village Glâmbocel, west of Târgoviște. For much of its length, it flows parallel to and at a short distance from the Argeș.

Towns and villages
The following towns and villages are situated along the river Sabar, from source to mouth: Bântău, Glâmbocata, Crângurile de Jos, Găești, Dragodana, Mătăsaru, Costeștii din Vale, Crovu, Potlogi, Florești, Stoenești, Palanca, Poenari, Bolintin-Vale, Mihai Vodă, Domnești, Bragadiru, Măgurele, Jilava, Vidra, Vărăști, Valea Dragului

Tributaries
The following rivers are tributaries to the river Sabar (from source to mouth):
Left: Saru, Potop, Cuparu, Mătăsarul, Frasin, Șuța, Băi, Ciorogârla, Cocioc
Right: Tinoasa

References

Rivers of Romania
Rivers of Ilfov County
Rivers of Giurgiu County
Rivers of Dâmbovița County